Qaleh-ye Zaras (also Romanized as Qal‘eh-ye Zarās, Qal‘eh Zarās, and Qal‘eh Zarrās; also known as Ghal’eh Zaras) is a village in Qaleh-ye Khvajeh Rural District, in the Central District of Andika County, Khuzestan Province, Iran. At the 2006 census, its population was 291, in 49 families.

References 

Populated places in Andika County